This Is Football 2 is a sports video game developed by SCE Studios Soho and published by Sony Computer Entertainment exclusively for PlayStation and released only in Europe. Clive Tyldesley was replaced as the English-language commentator by his fellow ITV colleague, Peter Drury. It is the successor to This is Football.

Reception

Absolute PlayStation gave the game 87% and said: "Compared to last years [sic] title This Is Football 2 is a much improved game."

References

External links

2000 video games
Association football video games
Europe-exclusive video games
Multiplayer and single-player video games
PlayStation (console) games
PlayStation (console)-only games
Sony Interactive Entertainment games
This Is Football
Video games developed in the United Kingdom
Team Soho games